Escort Group B6 was a British convoy escort group of the Royal Navy which saw action during the Second World War, principally in the Battle of the Atlantic.

Formation
Escort Group B6 was one of seven British escort groups which served with the Mid-Ocean Escort Force (MOEF), which provided convoy protection in the most dangerous midsection of the North Atlantic route. The MOEF was originally to be 5 American, 5 British and 4 Canadian groups. B6  was formed in the spring of 1942, following the inability of the US Navy to form groups A4 and A5 due to other commitments. To replace them two new escort groups, B6 and B7 were formed.

Service history
Led by Modified long-range V-class destroyer , and under the leadership of Commander John Waterhouse, Group B6 included four Norwegian-manned s from Group A4;
HNoMS Andenes (K01), 
HNoMS Eglantine (K197), 
HNoMS Potentilla (K214), 
and HNoMS Rose (K102). 
These were joined later by a fifth, HNoMS Montbretia (K208).

In the summer of 1942 B6 escorted several uneventful convoys which arrived without loss. However, in August 1942 ON 122 was attacked by 9 U-boats of wolfpack Lohs.  four ships were sunk, while six U-boats were damaged, four seriously enough to return to base. Two of these returning submarines were attacked by aircraft in the Bay of Biscay; one was sunk, another so badly damaged it had to be withdrawn from service.

In September B6 was joined by the F-class destroyer  as senior ship, whose commander Ralph Heathcote became Senior Officer of the Escort group (SOE). The following month SC 104 was attacked by Group Wotan. In a five-day battle (12–17 October) SC 104 lost eight ships while two U-boats (U-661 and U-353) were destroyed and two others damaged. During this action both Fame and Viscount were damaged and forced to withdraw, command falling to Lieutenant Commander Christian Monsen of Potentilla.

In November a depleted B6 group, still under Monsen, was escorting ON 144 which was attacked by 16 U-boats of Group Kreuzotter. In a fierce battle, five ships of the convoy, and the corvette Montbretia, were sunk. One U-boat was destroyed (U-184, sunk by Potentilla).  Monsen and the group were later commended for their aggressive defence, which was widely held to have averted a major disaster.

In December HX 217 was attacked by seven U-boats of group Panzer. B6, again led by Fame, and with the three Norwegian ships was now joined by the Polish destroyer , and a British corvette. Another aggressive defence kept losses to a minimum, even when Panzer was joined by a second wolf pack, Draufgang. Two ships were sunk in the three-day battle, while one U-boat was sunk by aircraft, and several others damaged. Another U-boat was lost, and one damaged, in a mid-ocean collision 

In February 1943 while escorting ON 165, the convoy was attacked by U-boats of Group Hardegen. Two U-boats were destroyed – U-69 sunk by Fame and U-201 by Viscount – for the loss of two ships. In late February and early March HX 227 was intercepted by group Neptun, but an aggressive defence and foul weather frustrated any co-ordinated attacks. Two stragglers were lost, while two U-boats were forced to return with damage.

Following the major convoy battles of May 1943, which left B6 and their charges unscathed, the Battle of the Atlantic fell into a lull as the U-boat Arm withdrew from the battle. Several uneventful convoys followed, until the renewal of the offensive in the autumn of 1943. In this period B6 was involved in one convoy battle, while escorting ON 206. This convoy, and ONS 20, both became embroiled in the last major convoy action of the campaign, which saw six U-boats destroyed, for one ships lost. None of these were accounted to ships of B6 however.

Following this action the North Atlantic route was again quiet, with B6 continuing escort duties, until in the spring of 1944 it was disbanded in a general re-organization prior to the invasion of Normandy. In its 23-month career B6 escorted 31 convoys, losing 19 ships, but seeing over 900 safely to harbour. The group lost one of its number, the corvette Montbretia, but was credited with the destruction of five U-boats.

Tables

Ships lost

HNoMS Montbretia (K208), torpedoed and sunk 18 November 1942 by

U-boats destroyed
  rammed by Viscount on 15 October 1942 
  rammed by Fame on 16 October 1942 
  depth-charged by Potentilla on 20 November 1942 
  rammed by Viscount on 17 February 1943 
  depth-charged by Fame on 17 February 1943

Convoys escorted

Senior Officer Escort

Notes

References
Clay Blair : Hitler's U-Boat War Vol II (1998). 
Paul Kemp  : U-Boats Destroyed  ( 1997) . 
Axel Neistle : German U-Boat Losses during World War II  (1998). 
 Rohwer, J. and Hummelchen, G.: Chronology of the War at Sea 1939–1945 (1992) 
Stephen Roskill : The War at Sea 1939–1945   Vol III, pt I (1960). ISBN (none)

Escort Groups of the Royal Navy in World War II